Miller Grove Independent School District is a public school district located in the unincorporated community of Miller Grove, in southwestern Hopkins County, Texas, United States. It extends into a small portion of Rains County.

Miller Grove ISD operates two schools:
Miller Grove High School (Grades 7-12) 
Miller Grove Elementary School (Grades PK-6).

In 2009, the school district was rated "academically acceptable" by the Texas Education Agency.

References

External links
Miller Grove ISD

School districts in Hopkins County, Texas
School districts in Rains County, Texas
1846 establishments in Texas
School districts established in 1846